The following is a selected list of characters who have appeared throughout The Mummy film series and its spin-off series The Scorpion King. Main and minor characters are included.

Main characters

Richard "Rick" O'Connell

Richard "Rick" O'Connell (Brendan Fraser) is the main character in The Mummy films. He is an American adventurer, highly decorated veteran of WW1 (Knight of Legion of Honor, Médaille Militaire, Croix de Guerre) a former Captain of the French Foreign Legion.

Evelyn Carnahan
Evelyn Carnahan (Rachel Weisz in The Mummy and The Mummy Returns and Maria Bello in The Mummy: Tomb of the Dragon Emperor) - also known as Evie - is characterized as a clever but clumsy Egyptologist in the Cairo Museum of Antiquities. She, along with Rick and her brother Jonathan, travels to the lost city of Hamunaptra, where she hopes to find a rare, ancient book, the book of Amun-Ra. When some Americans find the Book of the Dead, which was purported to give eternal life, Evie steals the book from the sleeping American Egyptologist and reads a page of it. This unintentionally resurrects the titular mummy, Imhotep. Imhotep wants to use her body as a vessel to resurrect his long-dead lover, Anck-su-namun, and he takes Evie captive. Upon being rescued, she reads a page from the book of Amun-Ra, rendering Imhotep mortal. Rick then stabs Imhotep in the stomach. While he dies, he returns to his original undead form as a rotting corpse with his final parting words, which Evie translates as "Death is only the beginning". Evie shows little fighting skill but much bravery, such as when she attempts to shoot a Medjai with Rick's gun, and fights Anck-su-namun. In the first part of the film she thinks Rick is "filthy, rude, a complete scoundrel. I don't like him one bit". However, as the first film progresses he slowly gains her trust and they eventually fall in love. She mentions that her and her brother's mother was Egyptian, making her half-Egyptian, half-English.

In The Mummy, the character was originally meant to be Evelyn Carnarvon, the daughter of Lord Carnarvon, both present at the opening of Tutankhamun's tomb in November 1922. She and her brother were to be the children of the "cursed" Lord Carnarvon. The only evidence of this left in the film is in the line where Evelyn tells O'Connell that her father was a "very, very famous explorer".

In The Mummy Returns it is revealed that she is a reincarnation of the Egyptian princess, Nefertiri, the daughter of the Pharaoh whom Imhotep and Anck-su-namun killed. This makes her battle with Anck-su-namun personal, as they were also foes in their past lives. She also regains her past life's knowledge of martial arts.

Alex O'Connell
Alexander "Alex" O'Connell (Freddie Boath in The Mummy Returns and Luke Ford in The Mummy: Tomb of the Dragon Emperor) is the son of Evie and Rick O'Connell. Throughout the second film, he is shown to have great intellect and bravery for a child of eight. Alex protects his parents from two potential attackers in a temple, before inadvertently causing its destruction. It is here that his parents discover the bracelet. When he puts on the Bracelet of Anubis, it reveals to him the path to the pyramid of the Scorpion King. He is captured by Imhotep's followers, and much of the film focuses on the attempts of his parents to rescue him. He has a witty and bratty attitude, but is good-hearted and intelligent far beyond his years, a trait his parents never hesitate to acknowledge. He is able to speak and read Egyptian better than Jonathan, having been taught by Evelyn, and is able to use the Book of the Dead to resurrect her when she is killed by Anck-su-namun.

In the third film, Alex had grown into a dashing and curious man, much like his father (he is also hinted at being a womanizer). He also speaks fluent Chinese. Unknown to his parents, Alex has left college and gone to China on a dig searching for a lost tomb. Alex eventually finds the tomb but is attacked. He unmasks his attacker to reveal a young Chinese girl. She escapes and Alex continues with the excavation of the tomb. His parents arrive unexpectedly in Shanghai and he is forced to explain what he has been doing. During a preview to the exhibition of the Dragon Emperor, the mummy is resurrected and flees the museum. The O'Connells pursue the mummy with the help of Lin, the girl who attacked Alex, and her mother Zi Yuan. In the end, Alex teams up with his father to kill the Dragon Emperor, falling in love with Lin along the way. Although Lin initially rejects his feelings due to her immortality, after she becomes mortal, Alex seems to enter a relationship with her as they are seen together at Jonathan's club.

Jonathan Carnahan
Jonathan Carnahan (John Hannah) is Evelyn's older brother. He is a thief of considerable skill with some knowledge in reading Egyptian but is not very athletic. He is the source of comic relief in the film, through his desire for treasure and irrepressible demeanor. He's less adept at fighting, navigating and negotiating than Rick, thus is often left behind. He has some skills in marksmanship, often holding his own against mummies when armed with a gun. He has a slight distrust and disapproval of Americans and their wild attitude. Jonathan is also the only person in the crew that was saved from a flesh-eating scarab beetle, after Rick removes it from his arm with his pocket knife. He is also the one who finds the Egyptian key with the map to Hamunaptra hidden inside. During the final battle, he takes control of Imhotep's guards and uses them to kill Anck-su-namun.

In the second film, he has lost his share of the family's new wealth apart from a golden sceptre, which he continues carrying around even after Imhotep is resurrected and they learn about the new threat of the Scorpion King. After his nephew Alex is captured by the cult of Imhotep to use the Bracelet of Anubis to find the oasis and temple of the Scorpion King, Jonathan assists in Alex's rescue by shooting down some of the cult. Later, after Evelyn is killed by the reincarnated Anck-su-namun, Jonathan faces her in single combat while Alex uses the Book of the Dead to bring his mother back to life. Rick realises that the sceptre Jonathan has been carrying opens up into the Spear of Osiris, which can be used to kill the Scorpion King, but Imhotep almost manages to use the Spear himself before Rick grabs it mid-flight. The family escape the collapsing temple, with Jonathan managing to claim a large diamond on the top of the temple for himself. 

By the third film, Jonathan has opened a nightclub in Shanghai named after Imhotep, but becomes caught up in the struggle against the now-reborn Dragon Emperor of China. After the Emperor's forces are defeated by an army of his undead enemies, Jonathan claims the powerful diamond the Eye of Shangri-La and leaves for Peru to open a new nightclub far away from any mummies (although mummies will be discovered later).

Ardeth Bay
Ardeth Bay (Oded Fehr) is the chief of the Medjai, the Muslim descendants of the royal bodyguards. The Medjai are the Pharaoh's sacred bodyguards, a group who have watched over and guarded Hamunaptra for centuries. They are sworn to do all in their power to prevent the resurrection of Imhotep. To this end, for over three-thousand years, the Medjai has silently guarded the decrepit city, either killing or scaring off all who found or approached it. Despite opposing the archaeologists as they begin digging, Ardeth Bay becomes an ally when it becomes apparent that they all must work together to stop Imhotep.

Bay's first actual appearance in The Mummy was during the opening battle between an outnumbered team of French Foreign Legionnaires and wild Tuareg bandits, which took place in the ruins of Hamunaptra. He paid close watch on one of the soldiers: an American named Rick O'Connell, as he desperately fought the raging Tuareg. Ardeth was also the narrator for the first parts of the first two films.

In the second film, Bay goes through many trials to stop the release of the Scorpion King, but does not succeed, and unfortunately, the Scorpion King is released. He leads his people in a desperate battle against the Anubis Warriors that form the Scorpion King's army. He also possesses a pet falcon named Horus, which he uses to send messages to the other Medjai tribes. Horus is later shot and dies. He is nearly killed from behind by a cultist, but is saved by Jonathan and heads off to gather the Medjai. He leads the Medjai in the battle against the Army of Anubis and survives.

This character was the resurrected Imhotep's alter ego as he passed himself off as a modern Egyptian in the 1932 film. The name "Ardeth Bay" is an anagram of "death by Ra". Ra was the ancient Egyptian sun god.

Imhotep

Imhotep (Arnold Vosloo) is the title character and antagonist of The Mummy and The Mummy Returns. In 1290 BC, Imhotep was High Priest of Osiris under the rule of Pharaoh Seti I. He began an affair with Pharaoh Seti's mistress, Anck-su-namun, and they murdered the Pharaoh when he discovered it. After doing so, they were discovered and Anck-su-namun committed suicide with the intention of having Imhotep resurrect her. He attempted to do so but was captured at Hamunaptra, and was punished by enduring the Curse of Hom Dai, a ritual that involved mummifying Imhotep alive with his sarcophagus filled with carnivorous scarab beetles. As a result of the curse, Imhotep was made an undead fiend with control over sand, other elements, and according to Evelyn the ten plagues of Egypt (six of which are shown in the film).

Three thousand years later, during an archaeological dig, Imhotep was accidentally unleashed and revived. After regenerating his body using the flesh and organs of the thieves who had been present when the box containing his organs (in their canopic jars) was opened, he set about trying to resurrect Anck-su-namun again, this time using Evelyn for a sacrifice. Ultimately, Imhotep is defeated when his immortality is taken by the powers of the Book of Amun-Ra and he is impaled by a scimitar. As he decays back into his skeletal mummy form and falls into the pool from which he summoned Anck-su-namun's soul, he mutters "Death is only the beginning" in Egyptian, to which Evelyn interprets.

In the second film, Imhotep was resurrected and freed from the resin he was trapped in at the end of the first movie. He proceeds to seek out the Bracelet of Anubis, which is the key to finding the lair of the Scorpion King. The Scorpion King is an ancient warrior whose power Imhotep needs as he is still mortal. After finding the bracelet on the arm of Alex O'Connell, Imhotep captures the boy and uses him to find the lair of the Scorpion King.

Once Imhotep reaches the lair, he is turned mortal and the powers granted by the Curse of Hom Dai are greatly diminished. When the Scorpion King responds to Imhotep's summons, Imhotep tricks him into attacking Rick O'Connell. When Rick kills the Scorpion King and sends him and his army to the Underworld, the palace begins to collapse. Rick and Imhotep both nearly fall into a chasm that leads to the underworld, and grab onto the ledge. While Rick is rescued by Evelyn, Anck-su-namun leaves Imhotep to die to save her own life. After this betrayal, Imhotep, since the whole reason for coming back was to be with his lover again, loses the will and reason to live, gives Rick and Evelyn a sad envious smile and willingly casts himself into the pit, thus ending his reign of terror once and for all.

He does not appear in the third film, only mentioned by Rick as "same mummy [I put down] twice". Ironically, he ends up having a nightclub in Shang-Hai named after him as a tribute by Jonathan Carnahan, who toasts him, saying: "Here's to you, princess. And Imhotep, may the bugger actually stay dead".

When he was regenerated, he gained several powers, some were: regeneration, invulnerability, turning himself into sand, and controlling the desert sands. During the first part of the first movie, Imhotep displays a strong fear of common house cats. Ardeth Bay and Evie's superior explain that Imhotep will fear them until he is fully regenerated, cats being associated with the Guardians of the Underworld in Egyptian mythology.

Anck-su-namun
Anck-su-namun (Patricia Velásquez) is the secret lover of Imhotep and the mistress and bodyguard of Pharaoh Seti I. Anck-su-namun had a deep rivalry with Princess Nefertiri. She kills the pharaoh and then herself at the beginning of The Mummy after her affair with Imhotep is exposed, and then waits for Imhotep to resurrect her so they can continue their relationship. Anck-su-namun appears briefly in The Mummy, as she is undead like Imhotep, and she tries to kill Evelyn in order to become fully alive after her soul enters her decayed body. However, Jonathan takes command of the mummies of Seti's bodyguards and has them stab and hack Anck-su-namun to death in the climactic fight sequence.

In the second film, Anck-su-namun was physically reincarnated as a woman by the name of Meela Nais, who, after Imhotep's secondary imprisonment, unearths him along with the Books of the Dead and Amun-Ra. After freeing Imhotep, she allows him to have her past-life's soul enter her body to completely become Anck-su-namun, regaining her memories and combat skills.

Knowing that Evelyn is the reincarnation of Nefertiri, Anck-su-namun succeeds in killing her, but she is resurrected by her son Alex while Jonathan distracts Anck-su-namun. After Evelyn's resurrection, she battles Anck-su-namun, forcing her to run away. Anck-su-namun leaves Imhotep to fend for himself, only to fall into a pit of scorpions.

Mathayus (Scorpion King)
Mathayus the Scorpion King (Dwayne Johnson) is the protagonist in The Scorpion King films series as well as one of the primary antagonists in The Mummy Returns. In The Scorpion King: Book of Souls, he is stated to be a demigod rather than a regular man.

Born in the kingdom of Akkad, Mathayus set out to join the Black Scorpions warrior group, but when he returned from his training, he found that his father's murderer, Sargon, had usurped the throne. Mathayus set out on a personal quest of vengeance to kill Sargon. After accomplishing the task, Mathayus was offered the position of king, but turned it down for a life of adventuring.

Later Mathayus, his brother Jesup and their friend Rama join a quest to get the Sword of Osiris and fight the powerful sorcerer Magus who lured them into a trap, destroyed their village and killed their King Uhmet. In this quest Mathayus defeated gods and creatures like Anubis, Horus, Minotaur, Sphinx, and Set and travelled to places like Crete, Netherworld and the Babel Tower. Mathayus eventually defeated Magus, and he, Jesup and Rama ended up being the last three Akkadians left in the world.

Mathayus was then hired to kill the Egyptian Tyrant, Memnon, who ruled a part of Egypt with his sorceress Cassandra and planned to rule it all. Memnon killed Mathayus' brother and the other Akkadian Rama, making Mathayus the last Akkadian. Once again, Mathayus embarked on a quest of vengeance, but would be aided by the likes of many in a quest to usurp Memnon. After killing Memnon, Mathayus wed Cassandra and was crowned the king of Memnon's empire.

This kingdom too would fall following Cassandra's death. However, through repeated work as a mercenary (as depicted in the third, fourth and fifth films), Mathayus again managed to become king years later and set out on a bloodthirsty quest to conquer the world. After conquering most of Egypt, Mathayus' advance was stopped at the city of Thebes. He was forced to make a deal with Anubis, where he would give Anubis his soul if Anubis helped him defeat his enemies. Anubis fulfilled his part of the deal and helped Mathayus destroy Thebes, providing him with command of his army of Anubis Warriors, jackal-headed warriors that can only be killed by beheading. Afterwards, Anubis transformed Mathayus into a centaurid scorpion-monster, possessing a humanoid head and torso with scorpion claws and main body in place of his hands and legs, condemned to serve him for all time.

Over the centuries, the Scorpion King's location and resting place is lost to history, but it is known that, if awakened, he will release his army of Anubis Warriors once again. The only way for his army to be stopped is for him to be killed in battle with another, with his killer subsequently taking control of the army of Anubis.

After being summoned by Imhotep, who wished to rob Mathayus of Anubis' army, he was tricked and engaged into battle with Rick (Imhotep's powers having been taken by Anubis when he entered Mathayus' tomb). Rick managed to use the Spear of Osiris to kill him, and his first and only command to the Army of Anubis was for the jackal-headed soldiers to return to the underworld, along with Mathayus himself.

The Mummy

Gad Hassan
Gad Hassan (Omid Djalili) was the warden of Cairo Prison, where Rick O'Connell was to be hanged. He was bribed by Evie and Jonathan to release O'Connell with 25% of the profits from the Hamunaptra expedition. He comes along on the expedition with the intent to protect his investment. As soon as the expedition reaches the City of the Dead, Hassan's greed takes over and he wanders alone searching for valuables to take. In the ruins he comes across a mural with what looks like jewels carved into the shape of scarabs. In his preoccupation with prying off the jewels, he fails to notice that one slips from his pouch and falls to the floor. The jewel cracks open to reveal a scarab beetle that burrows into his shoe and foot and crawls under his skin and up his body as he screams in horror. Hassan tears open his jumper to stop the bug, but he fails and the beetle goes into his brain. Shrieking in agony, he sprints off and runs into a solid rock wall, dying instantly. His death comes shortly after locals on the American expedition are killed by a salt acid booby trap.

Beni Gabor
Beni (Kevin J. O'Connor) was a Hungarian thief who enlisted in the French Foreign Legion and was part of the same unit as Rick O'Connell, which crossed Libya and Egypt to find Hamunaptra. During an overwhelming attack by an army of Tuareg nomads, he fled into the City and closed the entrance, making him the only one besides Rick to have survived the attack.

Three years later, he leads a group of American grave robbers to Hamunaptra, also encountering Rick again on his own expedition. However, while there he becomes separated from Rick during the panic of the Locust Plague and encounters Imhotep. Imhotep nearly kills Beni before learning Beni can communicate in Hebrew, the language of the slaves in ancient Egypt. Imhotep recruits Beni to act as his henchman with the promise of gold. Once Imhotep is fully regenerated and acquires everything he needs, he releases Beni from his service and allows him to take whatever he wishes from the treasure room as payment. After Imhotep is sent back to the underworld, Beni accidentally sets off an ancient booby trap, trapping himself in the treasure room where a swarm of flesh-eating scarabs close in to devour him, thus becoming the last member of the American expedition to die.

Terence Bey
Dr. Terence Bey (Erick Avari) was an Egyptologist, the curator of the Cairo Museum of Antiquities and a member of a secret society sworn to prevent priest Imhotep from being resurrected. He is first seen as a kind of supervisor to Evelyn in her librarian days. He is the beneficiary of Evelyn's parents' donation to the library that he is overseeing. Later, Evelyn, Rick and Jonathan found he was working with Ardeth to prevent the resurrection of priest Imhotep. He escapes from the Cairo Museum with Rick's crew. When Rick's crew is cornered by Imhotep, he sacrificed himself so that Rick, Ardeth and Jonathan would be able to escape in order to find and save Evelyn and kill Imhotep.

Winston Havelock
An aging, nostalgic British fighter pilot, Captain Winston Havelock (Bernard Fox) fought in World War I in the Royal Flying Corps, and stayed on into peacetime with the Royal Air Force. He is the sole British flyer of No. 9 Auxiliary Squadron at his isolated RAF station in Giza, all his fellows having either died or moved on to better postings. 

Winston and Rick knew each other when the latter was in the French Foreign Legion. Winston is first seen in The Mummy during the time of Mr. Burns's death lamenting the boredom of post-war life, forgotten by the RAF and missing his friends who died in the Great War. Yearning for one more chance to act bravely in the face of danger, Havelock eagerly agrees to fly Rick and his crew to Hamunaptra in his Great War-vintage biplane when Rick says Winston probably will not live through it. Winston dies when Imhotep summons a sandstorm that brings the plane down, his final words a cheerful "Here I come, laddies!"

Allen Chamberlain

Dr. Allen Chamberlain (Jonathan Hyde) is an Australian-British Egyptologist who travels with a trio of Americans, their guide, Beni, and a number of native diggers to reach Hamunaptra.

Dr. Chamberlain was the most prudent person in his party when it came to searching the ruins of the city for artifacts. The three Americans that accompanied him were solely interested in attaining gold and jewels. Dr. Chamberlain knew of the booby-traps and lore that surrounded the City of the Dead. Although he was more than reluctant to open the chest containing the Book of the Dead, he did so anyway and was thus subject to the curse that entailed. Once Evelyn had mistakenly called Imhotep back to life, he screamed out against it as it would put his and the Americans' cursed lives at risk, but it was too late. This indicates that he somehow knew about the power that the book held or simply believed in it. Imhotep had begun to consume those who participated in the opening of the chest, consuming Burns first. Dr. Chamberlain had made it back to Cairo with the others, but separated himself from their group. While trying to flee the city with the Book of the Dead, he ran into Imhotep, who had consummated the curse and assimilated Dr. Chamberlain's organs and fluids, leaving behind a dried husk in his clothes. He was the second member of the American expedition to die.

He held the canopic jar with the baboon head.

Bernard Burns
A bespectacled American adventurer, Bernard Burns (Tuc Watkins) was one of the treasure hunters that made his way to the City of the Dead in search of treasure. Despite his bookwormish appearance, Burns was a skilled gunfighter with an M1911 pistol. He was present when the chest containing the Book of the Dead was opened, and because of this was a victim of the curse that sealed it. Burns was caught by the mummified Imhotep, who was brought mistakenly to life by Evelyn, who had read from the Book. He was robbed of his eyes and tongue by the mummy, but was rescued by the Medjai before the mummy could do any more harm. The now-handicapped Burns made it to Cairo, where "Prince Imhotep" paid him a visit in his hotel room under the pretenses of purchasing the canopic jar that was in Burns' possession, but with the intent to finish consummating the curse, killing Burns. He was the first of the Americans to die.

He held the canopic jar with the human head.

Isaac Henderson
A stereotypical American cowboy, Isaac Henderson (Stephen Dunham) was one of the treasure hunters that made his way to the City of the Dead in search of treasure. His appearance was further emphasized by wielding a Colt Single Action Army revolver, and the habit of quick-drawing the weapon. Henderson was one of those present when the chest containing the Book of the Dead was opened, and because of this was a victim of the curse that sealed it. He escaped Hamunaptra with the others to Cairo, but later while guarding Evelyn's room, was attacked and drained of body fluids by Imhotep. He was the third of the Americans to die.

He held the canopic jar with the falcon head.

David Daniels
David Daniels (Corey Johnson) is also an American cowboy though less overtly so than Henderson. He is one of the treasure hunters that makes his way to the City of the Dead, looking for treasure. He uses two M1917 revolvers akimbo-style, and has a habit of wearing his coat only halfway. Daniels was present when the chest containing the Book of the Dead was opened, and because of this was a victim of the curse that sealed it. He escaped Hamunaptra with the others to Cairo, and was the last of the American party to survive until, during the escape from the mind-controlled Cairo citizens, Daniels is jerked out of the back of the car and is trapped by the citizens. They part and Imhotep walks toward Daniels. Daniels attempts to persuade Imhotep to spare him by giving him the jar he had stolen from the chest. However, Imhotep, furious, drains Daniels' body fluids while he screams off screen. In the novel written by Max Allan Collins, it is said that Daniels thought he might be spared after Imhotep smiled as he produced the jar to him. However, the scene of Daniels' death in the novel is when a blood curdling scream echoes.

He held the canopic jar with the jackal head.

The Mummy Returns

Baltus Hafez
Baltus Hafez (Alun Armstrong) was originally a curator in the British Museum, in charge of ancient Egyptian artifacts and antiquities when he was corrupted by the lure of power that was said to be obtained from defeating the Scorpion King, and for that he was the leader of a cult dedicated to defeating the Scorpion King by calling forth the High Priest Imhotep from death and assisting him in his wicked ways.

Lock-Nah
Lock-Nah (Adewale Akinnuoye-Agbaje) was the bodyguard of Meela Nais and chief enforcer of the Cult of Imhotep led by Baltus Hafez, who would work with the cult to obtain power before finally meeting his end at the hands of Ardeth Bay.

Meela Nais
Meela Nais (Patricia Velasquez) was the reincarnation of Anck-Su-Namun, a concubine of the Pharaoh Seti I, that joined a cult whose intent it was to see that the High Priest of Osiris Imhotep be resurrected and conquer the Earth.

Izzy Buttons
Izzy Buttons (Shaun Parkes) is Rick O'Connell's oldest and closest friend and a part-time pilot. The two worked together on a tugboat operation in the Atlantic following their time spent in the trenches of World War I. Izzy is often brash and quick to anger, but O'Connell's particular brand of sarcasm and anger are known to steady him. Izzy also has a spotty history with Jonathan, who defrauded him out of an investment in leather manufacturing. He also has a bitter history with Rick considering that he left him to hold an unknown merchandise in Marrakesh that lead to him being shot in his rear end, while Rick enjoyed the company of the local ladies. The O'Connells place unyielding trust in Izzy after his homemade hot-air balloon allows them to outrun Imhotep's attempt to eat them as a giant water face monster. Izzy rescues the others at the end of the film in the same hot-air balloon and they sail off into the sunset. He also wears an eyepatch he does not need, claiming "it makes me look rather dashing".

Red Willits
Red Willits (Bruce Byron) is the leader of the three thieves that were under the employ of British Museum curator turned cultist leader Baltus Hafez. Red and his gang (which include the ignorant and skittish Jacob Spivey (Tom Fisher) and the superstitious and more practical Jacques Clemons (Joe Dixon) were ordered to steal the Bracelet of Anubis when they were interrupted by a tidal wave Evy inadvertently caused. After they failed to obtain the chest, Red and his gang were ordered to obtain a chest from an unknown mausoleum, which turns out to be the very same chest that resulted in the deaths of Burns, Dr. Chamberlain, Henderson and Daniels from the first film. After a disagreement with the payment, Meela locks the three thieves into a train car and tricks them into opening the chest, after which they are all killed by Imhotep.

The Scorpion King

Cassandra
Cassandra (Kelly Hu) was Memnon's sorceress who can predict the future with her magic. Mathayus was hired to capture her but the two of them quickly fell in love. As they went back to Memnon's throne, she distracted Memnon so Mathayus can become king. However, Mathayus's reign did not last long after her death from a plague.

The Mummy: Tomb of the Dragon Emperor

Han (Dragon Emperor)
Han (Jet Li), also known as the Dragon Emperor, is the main antagonist in the third film. He was a ruthless warlord who desired immortality. To do so, he sought the sorceress Zi Yuan for the secrets of immortality. He orders his first in command, General Ming Guo, to never touch Zi Yuan, for he wishes her to be his queen. However, Zi Yuan has fallen in love with Ming Guo and, after making the Emperor immortal, wishes to live with him; in response, the Emperor has Ming Guo killed. It is shortly revealed that the Emperor was cursed once he was made immortal and turns into stone, as does his army. His body is excavated by Alex O'Connell and placed in a museum, where he is revived through the intervention of General Yang. Once revived, he manages to find Shangri-La where he completes his immortality and gains shapeshifting powers. He then kidnaps Lin, the daughter of Zi Yuan, and goes to the site where he was excavated, where he revives his Terracotta Army and kills Zi Yuan in close combat. In the end, he himself is killed when stabbed through the heart by Rick and Alex O'Connell with two pieces of a dagger cursed for the purpose of his destruction. He possessed control over the Five Chinese Elements (fire, water, earth, wood, and metal), shapeshifting and invulnerability.

Although the Emperor's dynasty has been changed to the Han dynasty for the film (as his title indicates), the character is loosely based on Qin Shi Huang, the first Emperor of China, from the Qin dynasty.

Zi Yuan
Zi Yuan (Michelle Yeoh) is a witch whom the Emperor sought out to receive the eternal life. She encountered Ming Guo, his general, who was sent to find her, and they fell in love. The Emperor forbade Ming Guo from touching Zi Yuan, but they defiantly embraced and she was impregnated with whom would grow up to be her daughter, Lin. After granting the Emperor his immortality, she wished to be with Ming Guo, but the Emperor instead had him killed. He then stabbed Zi Yuan, but not before she revealed that she had in fact laid a curse upon him that turned him and his army into stone. She managed to escape into the mountains where she was recovered by a yeti and taken to Shangri-La, where she became immortal and gave birth to her daughter. For the next 2,000 years they guarded the secrets of the Emperor until he was revived. The Emperor enters Shangri-La and lifts his curse, becoming fully immortal and gaining greater powers, and kidnaps Lin, taking her to where his body was found. Zi Yuan follows him with the O'Connells and sacrifices Lin's and her own immortality to raise an army of the Emperor's undead enemies to combat his newly raised Terracotta Army. She battles the Emperor in close combat where she is mortally wounded, but is able to provide Lin and the O'Connells a special dagger they use to destroy the Emperor.

Zi Yuan is also the narrator in the beginning of the third film.

Lin
Lin (Isabella Leong) is Zi Yuan's daughter and protector of the Dragon Emperor's tomb. Born after the death of her father 2,000 years ago, Ming Guo, at the hands of the Emperor, Lin was raised in Shangri-La and kept young and immortal with the water there. She tries to stop Alex O'Connell from unearthing the Emperor's body, but she is stopped by Alex's partner Professor Roger Wilson, who is actually working to resurrect him.

She and Alex meet again in Shanghai where the Emperor is put on display, and she reveals Wilson's treachery and tries to stab the Emperor's corpse in the heart with the only dagger that can kill him before he is resurrected, only to find that the body she stabbed in the display's sarcophagus is a decoy and that the Emperor's body is concealed within the terracotta sculpture of him. The Emperor is revived, and Lin fails to kill him in the ensuing chase. She guides the O'Connells to Shangri-La in the Himalayas, summoning the aid of the yeti living there. She also develops feelings for Alex, but claims they cannot be together since once her immortality is revealed to him, she may never overcome the pain of watching Alex die of age as she lives forever, remembering her mother had to watch her father die.

Soon the Emperor breaks into Shangri-La and becomes an immortal shapeshifter, kidnapping Lin and taking her to the site where he was unearthed. Recognizing her as the daughter of General Ming, he intends to have revenge on her mother by taking Lin as his own. He raises his army and battles Zi Yuan, who had sacrificed both Lin's and her own immortality to raise an undead army to fight off the Emperor's. Meanwhile, Alex rescues Lin. The Emperor mortally wounds Zi Yuan, who tells Lin to kill him. Lin, however, is despondent, making the O'Connells fulfill this wish. After the Emperor is defeated, the now-mortal Lin settles with Alex.

Ming Guo
General Ming Guo (Russell Wong) was the Emperor's second-in-command and his most trusted friend. He was sent to find Zi Yuan, a sorceress who could grant the Emperor immortality, and he fell in love with her upon first sight. The Emperor ordered Ming Guo to never touch Zi Yuan, but they embraced, and he impregnated her with a daughter, Lin. For this treachery, Ming Guo was executed, but not before Zi Yuan placed a curse on the Emperor that turned him into stone. Ming Guo was then buried under the Great Wall of China. 2,000 years later, Ming Guo was resurrected by Zi Yuan to lead an undead army consisting of the Emperor's enemies buried under the wall with him against the also resurrected Emperor's Terracotta Army. Although Zi Yuan was killed at the Emperor's hands, he and his army were ultimately defeated. Victorious, Ming Guo and his army moved onto a presumably blissful afterlife, where he would spend eternity with Zi Yuan, but not before he saw his daughter for the first and the last time. Ming Guo can safely be considered the first willing undead ally of the O'Connells in The Mummy series.

General Yang
General Yang (Anthony Wong) is a commander of a Chinese military faction, possibly part of the recently defeated Collaborationist Chinese Army allied with the Empire of Japan. Alternatively he may have been a renegade Kuomintang officer due to his German-style uniform, American Jeeps and captured Red Army weapons. He was the Emperor's supporter and set up the Emperor's revival and followed him to Shangri-La with his assistant Choi. He dies with Choi when they get crushed at the end of the film.

Mad Dog Maguire
Mad Dog Maguire (Liam Cunningham) is a pilot (though he shouldn't be) and an old friend of Rick O'Connell. He helps the O'Connells make their way to Tibet on their journey to Shangri-La. He also has a serious drinking problem. He returns at the end of the movie to provide covering fire for the O'Connells and Jonathan, wanting to go someplace where there are no mummies, gives him his club.

Roger Wilson
Professor Roger Wilson (David Calder) was Alex's supporter in his expedition of the Dragon Emperor's tomb, but is really in league with General Yang, who wishes to resurrect the Emperor. After excavating the Emperor's petrified body and placed in a museum in Shanghai, Wilson requested that Rick and Evelyn Carnahan-O'Connell bring the Eye Of Shangri-La to there, which would be used to resurrect the Emperor. Wilson insists that the newly resurrected Emperor take him with him, but the Emperor kills Wilson by severing his head with his flaming fingers.

Colonel Choi
Choi (Jessey Meng) is General Yang's assistant, second-in-command, and possibly his lover. She accompanies Yang to Shanghai when the O'Connells bring the Eye of Shangri-La to the museum to awaken the Emperor, where, after a skirmish with Evelyn, she helped General Yang revive the Dragon Emperor. Refusing to let him go despite his order, she died with General Yang when she and her superior were crushed to death inside the tomb. She has a long scar on her left side of her face.

References

Mummy